Ramananda Ray (IAST: Rāmānanda Rāya) lived in the Indian state of Odisha (Oḍiśā) during the latter part of the 15th century to around the middle part of the 16th century CE and was the author of the celebrated drama Jagannatha Vallabha Natakam.

He was the son of Bhavananda Raya, a resident of the village of Alalanatha (Brahmagiri) about 12 miles west of Puri, Odisha.Their family belonged to a noted Odia Karana community. Ramananda Raya had four brothers named Gopinatha Badajena (Governor of Midnapore),Kalanidhi, Sudhanidhi, and Vaninatha Nayaka. He and his brother Gopinath Badajena served as governors under Gajapati Prataparudra Deva of the Gajapati Empire from 1497 to 1540 CE, and his main office was being the governor of   Rajamahendri (Rajamahendravaram of Andhra Pradesh) on the bank of the Godavari river.

References

External links
 The Example of Ramananda Ray

Gaudiya religious leaders
People from Rajahmundry
Year of birth missing
Year of death missing